Ollison is a surname. Notable people with the surname include:

 Qadree Ollison (born 1996), American football player
 Ruth Allen Ollison, American journalist
 Shaun Ollison (born 1980), American model
 Tony Ollison, American football player
 Larry Ollison (born 1947), American author